Sunyata (1982) is the debut album by the American ambient musician Robert Rich. The title refers to śūnyatā, the Buddhist concept that all things in the material world are empty of meaning and independence.

Overview
The album was recorded during Rich’s studies at Stanford University. It was originally released on audio cassette.

In 1994, the title track, “Sunyata (Emptiness)” was included on the two-disc compilation Trances/Drones. Because of the length restrictions of the compact disc format, when Sunyata was finally released on CD in 2000, this track was omitted.

Track listing
"Dervish Dreamtime" – 19:00
"Sunyata (Emptiness)" – 24:00
"Oak Spirit" – 43:00

References

1982 debut albums
Robert Rich (musician) albums
Hypnos Records albums